Yaohnanen, also spelled Ionhanen, is a village located on the island of Tanna in Vanuatu, at about 6 km south-east of the island main town, Lenakel.

It is well known for the participation of its villagers in the Prince Philip Movement.

Yaohnanen people were featured on the second season of the Spanish television series Perdidos en la Tribu (Lost in the Tribe), in which they lived with a Spanish family during the course of 21 days, teaching them their customs and culture, and also in the first season of the same Portuguese series called Perdidos na Tribo.

Gallery

References

External links
 Yam dance at Yaohnanen – amateur photos of folklore dance in Yaohnanen

Populated places in Vanuatu
Tafea Province